Kevin & Perry Go Large is a 2000 British teen coming of age sex comedy film based on the Harry Enfield sketch Kevin the Teenager. The film was written by Dave Cummings and Harry Enfield and directed by Ed Bye. Enfield, Kathy Burke and Louisa Rix all return to their roles after previously appearing on Harry Enfield & Chums. James Fleet replaced Stephen Moore as Kevin's father. Although the film received mixed reviews upon release, it has since gained a cult following primarily due to its soundtrack.

Plot 
The film begins at the beheading of Anne Boleyn, which turns out to be an erotic daydream that introduces teenage protagonist Kevin, who is having sexual fantasies when he's supposed to be doing his history homework. Kevin has tried to lose his virginity for three years. He and his best friend Perry go to a newsagent's to buy a pornographic magazine. Like all of Kevin's previous attempts at sexual exploration, this ends in failure when he sees his father and pretends to fall on the street to hide the magazine.

The boys decide they want to go to Ibiza to become DJs and get "guaranteed sex", but when Kevin's parents, Ray and Sheila (James Fleet and Louisa Rix), see his bad school report, they forbid the trip. But later they compromise: the boys can go if they get jobs to pay for it. The boys search fruitlessly for jobs and end up at a house party, where a popular local girl, Sharon, passes out drunk next to Kevin. Perry, seeing the two in bed together the following morning, assumes Kevin has lost his virginity and Kevin lies, saying he had sex with Sharon but gets overheard while leaving the party. In the town centre, an angry Sharon later confronts and humiliates Kevin about this, mocking him and calling him "virgin".

Kevin arrives home in misery, just in time to sign for the delivery of his dad's new credit card. He seizes the card and takes it to the bank to steal the plane fare from his dad's bank account. At the bank, he accidentally foils a bank robbery and the bank manager rewards him and Perry with a large amount of cash with which the boys plan to fund the trip. 
As a reward, Kevin's parents approve of the trip, as long as they can accompany the boys, much to Kevin's horror.

Once in Ibiza, the boys spot the 'girls of their dreams' Candice (Laura Fraser) and Gemma (Tabitha Wady). They also meet arrogant club DJ and record producer Eyeball Paul (Rhys Ifans) (whose nickname derives from his practice of vodka eyeballing). The boys spend the day at the beach and chat with the girls but are unsuccessful in seducing them.

That night, the boys walk down the high street filming the events around them. Kevin films a couple snogging, and they turn out to be Ray and Sheila. Kevin sulks while he and Perry hang out with Ray and Sheila, finally ending up at the club "Amnesia" where they dance the night away—without Candice and Gemma, who were refused entry by the doorman (Paul Whitehouse), who holds a hand-mirror to their faces and comments that they're "ugly" and "offend [his] mirror."

The next day the boys go to Paul's and he makes them clean his house in return for his listening to their tapes. When they leave there, they spot Candice and Gemma, but again their clumsy attempts to woo them end in failure although the girls bond with the boys when realising they know Eyeball Paul and they may be able to get them into the clubs.

The boys wait outside the girls' hotel for 4 hours while the girls have a makeover, and they are admitted to Amnesia with Kevin and Perry, but yet again the boys "strike out" when they get vomited on by other revellers and they leave, embarrassed while the girls later meet two other attractive men in the club. 
That night, Perry videotapes Ray and Sheila having sex. The next day, Paul listens to the boys' music as they clean his kitchen. He stumbles across the parents' sex tape and shows it to everyone. Kevin lashes out at Perry when he realized that it was Perry who filmed them. Baz, Paul's manager and chauffeur driver later persuades Paul to give the video back to the boys.

Kevin spends the rest of the day sulking around alone and becomes dejected when he sees the girls with the two other men from the club. 
Perry spends the day at the beach where he bumps into the girls and the two men who are revealed to be gay lovers who the girls had befriended. Gemma reveals she is attracted to Perry and Candice admits to liking Kevin. Perry then runs into Eyeball Paul, who says he likes their song and he'll play it in the club that night. Perry hurries to tell Kevin the good news and the friends reconcile.

That night they and the girls go to the club again in Paul's limousine. Their track is played, but the boys and Ray and Sheila, who had wanted to visit the club, are embarrassed to find that Paul has incorporated the sex tape and the boy's love messages to the girls into the track in an attempt to humiliate the boys.

Nevertheless, this backfires on Paul when the track becomes an instant club favourite and the entire crowd, including the girls, love the boys and their mix. Paul is unhappy at the boys' success and turns off the track, which angers the crowd. 
Paul becomes annoyed and attempts to destroy the boy's vinyl record but is stopped by Baz. Paul fires Baz who quickly punches and pushes Paul off stage before returning the record to the boys to continue the set and the crowd continue to party.

Kevin and Perry take over as DJs and keep the club dancing through the night. Early the next morning, Kevin and Perry finally have sex with Candice and Gemma respectively, on a beach surrounded by other similarly involved couples having sex.

In the Epilogue, the girls become the boys' girlfriends while Kevin and Perry are seen signing copies of their record in a music shop  with Baz as their new manager. Sharon reappears and receives a signed copy of the record, she then boasts that she and Kevin had sex before he was famous while Kevin's parents sign copies of their videos about better mid-marriage sexual intimacy.

Cast

Production

Music

Enfield used popular dance music tracks from the era:
 Y:Traxx – "Mystery Land (Sickboys Courtyard Remix)"
 The Precocious Brats feat. Kevin & Perry – "Big Girl (All I Wanna Do Is Do It!)"
 Fatboy Slim – "Love Island (4/4 Mix)"
 The Wiseguys – "Oh La La"
 Underworld – "King of Snake (Fatboy Slim Remix)"
 CRW – "I Feel Love (R.A.F. Zone Mix)"
 Jools Holland & His Rhythm & Blues Orchestra feat. Jamiroquai – "I'm In the Mood for Love"
 Fragma – "Toca Me"
 Fragma – "Toca Me (Inpetto Mix)"
 Ayla – "Ayla (DJ Taucher Remix)"
 Sunburst – "Eyeball (Eyeball Paul's Theme)"
 Yomanda – "Sunshine (Hi-Gate remix)"
 Oasis – "Wonderwall" (excerpts performed by Mr. & Mrs. Patterson)
 Mauro Picotto – "Lizard (Claxxix Mix)"
 Gladys Knight – "The Look of Love"
 Skip Raiders feat. Jada – "Another Day (Perfecto Dub Mix)"
 Samuel Barber – "Barber's 'Adagio For Strings'"
 Hybrid feat. Chrissie Hynde – "Kid 2000"
 The Precocious Brats feat. Kevin & Perry – "Big Girl (All I Wanna Do is Do It!) (Yomanda Remix)"
 Phil Pope & Los Lidos – "Mi Amour"
 Roger Sanchez – "The Partee"
 The Clash – "Straight To Hell"
 Lange feat. The Morrighan – "Follow Me"
 Tosca – "Fuck Dubs Parts 1&2"
 Groove Armada – "Chicago"
 The Birthday Party – "Release the Bats"
 Ver Vlads – "Crazy Ivan"
 Drew Milligan & Stewart Resiyn – "Elixir"
 Nick Bardon & Steve Warr – "Insanity"
 Dominic Glynn & Martin Smith – "Onslaught"
 Laurie Johnson – "Galliard"
 Mike Hankinson – "Death & The Maiden"
 Nightmares on Wax – "Sweet Harry" / "Emotion"
 Nightmares on Wax – "Ethnic Majority"
 Southside Spinners – "Luvstruck"
 The Precocious Brats feat. Kevin & Perry – "Big Girl (All I Wanna Do is Do It!) (The Shaft Remix)"
 Signum feat. Scott Mac – "Coming on Strong"

DJ Judge Jules created the mix that Kevin and Perry create in the film, "Big Girl", which was subsequently released as a single credited to the Precocious Brats with Kevin And Perry. It was in the top 40 for 4 weeks in 2000, and reached #16 in the UK Singles Charts.

"Straight to Hell" by The Clash features at the beginning of the film when Kevin begins banging his head on the bedroom wall; the camera pans out to view the street, in which the film title appears. All of the cars are Ford Focuses, and all of the people shown outside are wearing red baseball caps and using Flymo lawnmowers.

In the film, Eyeball Paul is a wealthy and very successful DJ; however, actor Rhys Ifans admits he is a terrible DJ, but thanks to "the magic of film" he'll "look pretty sharp out there".

Locations
The Ibiza club Amnesia makes an appearance in the film. However, the front view of the club, as shown in the film, is not the same as the actual Amnesia.  The DJ booth that Eyeball Paul uses in the film is not the actual booth of the club, which is sited above the giant "spectrum analyser", seen in the film to the right of the fictitious booth. The Harlequin Shopping Centre in Watford was also used. Freemans Close in Stoke Poges in Buckinghamshire was used for the location of the Patterson's house. Ibiza Airport was briefly used; however, the footage of a Virgin Sun Airlines plane landing was actually filmed at El Altet airport in Alicante.

Kevin and Perry and Kevin's parents' apartment is in Santa Eulària des Riu in Ibiza. The beach that the boys go to is Cala Benirras on the western shore north of San Antonio. 
The buying of the indecent magazine was done in the high street of Shepperton.

The opening sequence where Kevin dreams of saving Anne Boleyn from execution was filmed at Dover Castle.

Viewing certificate
Harry Enfield suspected that the "two uses" of the word "fuck" (there were actually three, all by Rhys Ifans) were the cause of the film's BBFC rating being a 15, rather than a targeted 12. He revealed in the film's audio commentary that the 15 rating was given because of a scene where a group of men took drugs. According to BBFC guidelines, scenes of drug-taking often breach the rules of a 12-rated film.

Reception

Box office
Kevin & Perry Go Large was the top-grossing film at the British box office over the Easter weekend of 2000, taking £2 million and ranking as the number one film in the UK. The next week the film was knocked off the top spot by Scream 3, but it regained its number one position the week after, in a week in which box office revenues were down due to warm weather.

Critical reception
The film was generally negatively received by critics and has a rating of 14% on the review aggregator website Rotten Tomatoes. The Guardian said the film was inferior to "the wave of American gross-out comedies," but noted that "Enfield himself can raise a laugh simply by throwing his arms around and moaning—as he frequently does—'I'm not your slave!'" Empire rated the film 3 out of 5 stars. Radio Times also gave the film 3 stars out of 5, whilst the BBC rated the film 4 stars out of 5. Mark Sinker of the British Film Institute reviewed the film, saying "Go Large is an amiable roll through vomit, poo and erections, public-humiliation and hating-your-parents gags, working through the most obvious permutations and a scatter of clever ones. Fans of Harry Enfield and Kathy Burke's characters get pretty much what they are after. Their foray beyond the television-skit format of Harry Enfield and Chums cheerfully enters the revolting world of Farrelly Brothers' humour."

Since the film's release it has gone on to earn cult status amongst many clubbers across the UK and Ireland, largely for its soundtrack, humour, performances from Harry Enfield and Kathy Burke and its references to rave culture.

References

External links

2000 films
2000s buddy comedy films
2000s coming-of-age comedy films
2000s sex comedy films
2000s teen comedy films
British buddy comedy films
British coming-of-age comedy films
British teen comedy films
Cross-dressing in British films
2000s English-language films
Films about vacationing
Films about virginity
Films based on television series
Films set in Ibiza
Films shot in Buckinghamshire
Films shot in Hertfordshire
Films shot in Spain
Icon Productions films
Tiger Aspect Productions films
Film controversies in the United Kingdom
Rating controversies in film
2000 comedy films
2000s British films